Cynthia Robinson (January 12, 1944 – November 23, 2015) was an American musician, best known for being a founding member, the trumpeter and a vocalist in Sly and the Family Stone. Her voice and presence were featured in the hits "Dance to the Music" and "I Want to Take You Higher." Questlove of the hip hop band the Roots has called Robinson the original "hypeman."

Robinson was among the first female trumpeters in a major American band, and the first such player in the Rock and Roll Hall of Fame. Robinson’s career with Sly Stone began in 1966 when the bandleader put together a group called the Stoners. They fell apart quickly, though, and she became a fixture of the Family Stone – a group whose members were male and female and represented different races, a novel idea at the time – alongside her cousin Larry Graham.

She was the only member of the original Family Stone to continue working with Sly Stone after the band fell apart in 1975. She also played in the funk band Graham Central Station with Family Stone bandmate and cousin Larry Graham, starting in the 1990s. She also worked with George Clinton and Prince.

Early life
Robinson grew up in Sacramento, California. She lived in Oak Park, a neighborhood in Sacramento. She played flute in elementary school, but there were no flutes available at her high school, and she was told to play the clarinet. Unhappy, she asked a fellow student, whom she had heard playing the trumpet in a practice room, if she could give his instrument a try.

“Everything I blew was off key, but I knew it could sound good if you worked on it, and that’s what I wanted to do,” she told the online magazine Rookie in 2013.

She attended Sacramento High School where she played trumpet in the school band. Robinson was taunted by the boys in her band class for being a black girl playing a "white boy's instrument". Robinson even recalled teachers suggesting she take up a different activity and save the trumpet for the boys, but Robinson was in love with the trumpet.

Her first trumpet belonged to a beatnik, who told her she could have it if she played at one of his parties. “It smelled bad, it had all kinds of green crud inside the tubing, so I took it home, cleaned it, soaked it in hot water, cleaned it all out, and it was mine,” she told Rookie.

She was a founding member of Sly and the Family Stone, starting in 1966.

Legacy and death

Robinson was inducted into the Rock and Roll Hall of Fame as a member of Sly and the Family Stone. In 2006, she reunited with the original band members of Family Stone.

On November 23, 2015 Robinson died of cancer in Carmichael, California at the age of 71.

Robinson was the mother of two daughters: Laura Marie Cook and Sylvyette Phunne Robinson (fathered by former band leader, Sly Stone).

Appears on
 Stargard – Back 2 Back - Warner Bros. Records – BSK 3456 (1981) 
 Funkadelic  – The Electric Spanking Of War Babies – Warner Bros. Records – BSK 3482 (1981) – Tracks: "Funk Gets Stronger" (Part I),  "Funk Gets Stronger" (Killer Millimeter Longer Version) / "She Loves You"
 Graham Central Station  – GCS2000 – NPG Records (1998) – Track: "GCS2000" 
 The Robert Cray Band - Time Will Tell - Sanctuary Records 06078-84613-2 (2003) – Track: "Your Pal"

References

External links
Family Stone website
Family Affair: Cynthia Robinson (March 7, 2021)
In loving memory of Ms Cynthia Robinson (january 12, 1944 - november 23, 2015)Rich Romanello with help from Edwin & Arno Konings presents :Sly & The Family Stone – Live at the Winchester Cathedral, Redwood City, CA March 1967 - "St. James Infirmary" feat. Cynthia Robinson on trumpet

1944 births
2015 deaths
African-American women singers
American funk singers
American soul singers
American trumpeters
Deaths from cancer in California
Musicians from Sacramento, California
Sly and the Family Stone members
American funk musicians
American soul musicians
People from Carmichael, California
Women trumpeters